Dropla may refer to:

 Dropla, Burgas Province, village in Bulgaria
 Dropla, Dobrich Province, village in Bulgaria
 Dropla Gap,  flat, ice-covered saddle in Ellsworth Mountains, Antarctica